The Office of the Vice-President is a ministry in Zambia. It is headed by the Vice-President of Zambia.
The current vice president is W. K. Mutale Nalumango. 
One or more deputy ministers are appointed to the Office.

List of deputy ministers

References

Office of Vice President
 O